Johnny Lundberg (born 15 April 1982) is a retired Swedish footballer who played for Landskrona BoIS, FC Nordsjælland, Halmstads BK and Sandnes Ulf as a defender.

Career
Starting his career in Landskrona BoIS at the age of 6, he then made his debut for the club in 2001 in Superettan, coming on as a substitute against GIF Sundsvall. He was regular starting player during the 2004 season and followed the club back down to Superettan. In 2006, he signed for Danish Superliga club FC Nordsjælland, however he did not leave until 1 January 2007, he stayed until the summer 2009 when he signed for Swedish Allsvenska club Halmstads BK. Prior to the 2010 season Halmstads BK manager Lars Jacobsson announced that Lundberg would be the new team captain, replacing Tommy Jönsson.

References

External links

1982 births
Living people
Swedish footballers
FC Nordsjælland players
Landskrona BoIS players
Halmstads BK players
Danish Superliga players
Allsvenskan players
Swedish expatriate footballers
Expatriate men's footballers in Denmark
Sandnes Ulf players
Association football defenders
People from Landskrona Municipality
Footballers from Skåne County